Tiparra Reef (also spell as Tipara) is a reef located in Spencer Gulf in South Australia about  west of the town of  Port Hughes.  

Much of the lighthouse structure remains in place along with a minor navigation aid consisting of a flashing light.

References

External links
Kayak trip Tiparra reef South Australia 2011

Spencer Gulf
Reefs of Australia